Sergey Savelyev may refer to:

 Sergey Savelyev (skier) (1948-2005), Soviet cross-country skier 
 Sergey Savelyev (scientist) (born 1959), Russian biologist
 Sergey Savelyev (speed skater) (born 1972), Russian speed skater